Stephen, Steven or Steve Katz may refer to:

Steve Katz (writer) (1935–2019), American writer
Steve B. Katz professor emeritus, scholar, poet, Clemson University  
Steve Katz (musician) (born 1945), American musician
Steven T. Katz (born 1944), Jewish philosopher
Steven A. Katz (born 1959), writer of the screenplay Shadow of the Vampire
Steve Katz (politician) (born 1953), veterinarian and member of the New York State Assembly
Stephen Katz (writer) (1946–2005), American teacher and screenwriter
Stephen Katz (real name Matthew Angerer), traveling companion of travel writer Bill Bryson
Stephen M. Katz (cinematographer)